Sar Kahuran (also Romanized as Sar Kahūrān and Sah Kahooran; also known as Kahūrā and Sar Kūhurān) is a village in Howmeh Rural District, in the Central District of Iranshahr County, Sistan and Baluchestan Province, Iran. At the 2006 census, its population was 931, in 184 families.

References 

Populated places in Iranshahr County